The Colombian Communist Party (PCC) is a legal communist party in Colombia. It was founded in 1930 as the Communist Party of Colombia, at which point it was the Colombian section of the Comintern. The party is led by Jaime Caycedo and publishes a weekly newspaper named Voz.

The Revolutionary Armed Forces of Colombia (FARC) was founded as the armed wing of the PCC in 1964, but the two organisations separated in 1993.

History

The Communist Party of Colombia was established in 1930 as the Colombian branch of the Comintern. The party pushed for improved conditions for Colombian laborers and an expansion of rights for the lower classes in Colombian society. Through the PCC, groups of laborers organized to combat the regulations and actions of the government and empowered corporations. These groups, known as "peasant leagues", established an interconnected network that coordinated protests and labor strikes, countered state-sanctioned violence, and sought to protect local populations. The state opposed the actions of these groups through military violence in attempt to repress the influence of the PCC. The PCC continued growing in membership and support, even as the Colombian Conservative Party returned to power in 1946 with Conservative Mariano Ospina Perez winning the presidency. In the mid-1960s the U.S. State Department estimated the party membership to be approximately 13,000, with further support from over 25,000 Colombian citizens.

During the events of "La Violencia" and after the development of "La Frente Nacional" (The National Front), the Colombian government continued its repression of communist groups and takeover of land. The PCC became involved with guerrilla groups and local communist militias who continued rebelling against the national government. While many such guerrilla groups disbanded and demobilized during the ceasefire proclaimed by General Gustavo Rojas Pinilla in the early 1950s, various entities continued their mobilization efforts. PCC leadership, joined by guerilla leaders, established las "Fuerzas Armadas Revolucionarias de Colombia—Ejército del Pueblo" or Revolutionary Armed Forces of Colombia (FARC). The PCC would be involved with FARC until 1993.

Three members of the PCC were known to have undergone training with the East German Ministry of State Security (MfS); such courses, provided by the "Task Force of the Minister, Responsibility Special Issues" ("Arbeitsgruppe des Ministers, Aufgabenbereich Sonderfragen"- AGM/S) and additionally accompanied by KGB officers, encompassed a wide range of paramilitary infiltration and sabotage techniques, but no additional details are known.

The PCC was a founding member of the Social and Political Front (FSP) party coalition, which later merged into the Alternative Democratic Pole (PDA) alliance.

President-elect Gustavo Petro announced on 6 August 2022 that PCC member Gloria Inés Ramírez would become Colombia's new Minister of Labor. This marked the first time that a member of the PCC had obtained a ministerial position in the Colombian government.

Relationship with FARC

Early years
During and following the La Violencia civil war that erupted in Colombia from the late 1940s to the mid-1950s, the communists developed organic links to several liberal guerrilla and irregular rural forces, most of whom nominally depended on the official Colombian Liberal Party and eventually demobilized by the end of that period. Those groups with more direct relations with the PCC tended to not demobilize, keeping their weapons and organizational structures mostly intact. In 1947, a short-lived Communist Labour Party was formed by former members of the PCC.

Later, in 1964, a section of these guerrillas would develop into the Revolutionary Armed Forces of Colombia (FARC-EP), which initially was considered as the official armed wing of the Communist party. The PCC leadership mostly operated in the cities during the 1960s and 1970s, but it supported the operations of the FARC, regularly holding solidarity and donation rallies for FARC members and units, as well as occasionally providing other forms of aid (supplies, equipment, intelligence, political cadres or ideological literature).

The PCC justified the operations of the guerrillas as the armed component of the fight against capitalism and imperialism in Colombia, while at the same time it continued to participate in legal electoral activities independently. Both activities were considered to have their own place within the so-called "combination of all forms of struggle", a concept often employed by PCC and FARC.

Moving apart
Gradually the PCC and FARC-EP grew apart politically, in particular during the later 1980s. Both organizations had their share of internal debates, for example as to which entity would have greater influence and control over the Unión Patriótica (in the end the PCC accepted FARC supremacy in this regard) during its formation, and later on the issue of continuing to participate in elections as the UP suffered violent suppression (the FARC began to separate itself from legal UP activities starting in 1987).

Other disagreements would include that the PCC may have allegedly tended to follow the changes that developed within the official Soviet line during the Cold War, which the FARC-EP did not consider as strictly binding. After the Berlin Wall fell, confusion among the two sides increased. The principle of the "combination of all forms of struggle" was also brought into question at the time by some members of the PCC and UP leadership. The PCC officially broke with the FARC in 1993.

As a result, a separate Clandestine Colombian Communist Party was officially formed in 2000, though some sort of separate FARC-based internal party structure had been in de facto existence during most of the 1990s. Both organizations have remained completely distinct in their activities, though individual members of both parties may have continued to maintain working relationships on occasion.

Persecution
During most of its history the PCC has been the subject of repression and persecution both by private individuals, active and retired government agents and others. The PCC was severely weakened by paramilitary massacres and assassinations from the early 1980s to the mid-1990s.

A leading PCC figure, Arturo Díaz García, was assassinated on 21 December 2005 in the corregimiento of Toche in the municipality of Ibagué, Tolima. Supporters of David Ravelo, a member of the PCC's central committee who is serving an 18-year sentence for plotting to murder a municipal official, contend that he is a political prisoner who was prosecuted illegitimately.

Nearly 7,000 communist militants have been killed since the 1980s.

References

External links
PCC Party website 

1930 establishments in Colombia
Bolivarianism
Colombia
Communist parties in Colombia
Far-left politics in Colombia
FARC
Foro de São Paulo
Political parties established in 1930
International Meeting of Communist and Workers Parties